U.S. Route 49E (US 49E) is an  U.S. Highway in the Delta region of Mississippi. It travels through Yazoo, Holmes, Leflore, and Tallahatchie counties.

Route description

US 49E begins at an interchange between US 49 and US 49W, just north of downtown Yazoo City in Yazoo County. It heads northeast along the western edge of some Loess bluffs for several miles to pass through Eden and enter the Hillside National Wildlife Refuge before crossing into Holmes County.

The highway passes through the refuge for several miles before leaving, crossing over some railroad tracks, and heading north along the banks of Bee Lake to pass through Thornton. US 49E turns northeast to become concurrent with MS 12 and pass through Mileston before passing through rural farmland for a few miles to enter Tchula. In Tchula, the highway bypasses downtown to south and east, where it intersects unsigned MS 835 and MS 12 splits off toward Lexington. US 49E parallels Tchula Lake as it passes through the Morgan Brake National Wildlife Refuge and Cruger, where it intersects unsigned MS 818. It then crosses into Leflore County shortly thereafter.

The highway immediately passes through the Mathews Brake National Wildlife Refuge before passing through Sidon, where it intersects MS 706, and Rising Sun. US 49E now enters Greenwood and comes to an interchange and becomes concurrent with US 82/MS 7 just south of downtown. Prior to this point, the entire route of US 49E is a two-land highway. The highway heads as a four-lane highway to pass through business districts and cross the Yazoo River before leaving Greenwood and US 49E splits off and heads north. US 49E narrows to 2-lanes and has an intersection with MS 442 before passing through Minter City, where it intersects MS 8. It now crosses into Tallahatchie County.

US 49E crosses a bridge over a creek before passing through Glendora (where it intersects MS 734), Webb (where it has a short concurrency with MS 32), and Sumner (where it intersects MS 728) as it parallels the Tallahatchie River to the east. The highway then enters Tutwiler and comes to an end shortly thereafter at a Y-Intersection between US 49, US 49W, and MS 3.

History

U.S. Route 49E represents the original route of US 49 between 1928 and 1932, when the US 49E/W split between Yazoo City and Tutwiler was made. This route is now generally perceived as the lesser of the two.

It is notable that for several years during the 1930s, a second split route existed on US 49 in South Mississippi, similar to but shorter than the split that still exists in the Delta region.  Between Brooklyn and Hattiesburg, travelers had the option of a  direct route via US 49W, or a somewhat shorter but broken route on US 49E, serving the Forrest County Agricultural High School and the small community of McLaurin, Mississippi.

Major intersections

See also

References

External links

E
49E
49E
Transportation in Yazoo County, Mississippi
Transportation in Holmes County, Mississippi
Transportation in Leflore County, Mississippi
Transportation in Tallahatchie County, Mississippi